Thomas Harold Lang (11 November 1890 – 9 October 1970) was an Australian rules footballer who played with St Kilda in the Victorian Football League (VFL).

Notes

External links 

1890 births
1970 deaths
Australian rules footballers from Melbourne
St Kilda Football Club players
People from Kensington, Victoria